Lectionary 159, designated by siglum ℓ 159 (in the Gregory-Aland numbering) is a Greek manuscript of the New Testament, on parchment leaves. Dated by a colophon to the year 1061.

Description 

The codex contains weekday Gospel lessons from Easter to Pentecost and Saturday/Sunday Gospel lessons for the other weeks lectionary.
It is written in Greek minuscule letters, on 267 parchment leaves (27.6 by 21.5 cm), in two columns per page, 19 lines per page. It contains music notes and oriental pictures; peculiarly bound.

History 

The manuscript was written by John. Formerly it was held in the monastery of Gerasimus near of Jericho.

The manuscript is sporadically cited in the critical editions of the Greek New Testament (UBS3).

Currently the codex is located in the Greek Orthodox Patriarchate (Panagias s. n.) at Jerusalem.

See also 

 List of New Testament lectionaries
 Biblical manuscript
 Textual criticism

Notes and references 

Greek New Testament lectionaries
11th-century biblical manuscripts